3567 Alvema, provisional designation , is a dark asteroid from the middle region of the asteroid belt, approximately 14 kilometers in diameter. It was discovered by Belgian astronomer Eugène Delporte at the Royal Observatory of Belgium in Uccle, on 15 November 1930. It was named after the discoverer's three great-granddaughters Aline, Vérionique and Martine.

Orbit and classification 

Alvema orbits the Sun in the central main-belt at a distance of 1.9–3.7 AU once every 4 years and 8 months (1,698 days). Its orbit has an eccentricity of 0.31 and an inclination of 7° with respect to the ecliptic. No precoveries were taken prior to its discovery.

Physical characteristics 

The X-type asteroid is classified as a Xc-subtype on the SMASS taxonomic scheme, while the NEOWISE mission of NASA's space-based Wide-field Infrared Survey Explorer groups it into the P-type spectral class.

Rotation period 

In December 2014, a rotational lightcurve of Alvema was obtained from photometric observations by French amateur astronomer Laurent Bernasconi. The asteroid's first lightcurve was reported by astronomer Darryl Sergison at the Gothers Observatory in the United Kingdom, from observations made in November 2009, showing a period of  hours with an amplitude of 0.17 magnitude.

Diameter and albedo 

According to the survey carried out by NEOWISE, Alvema measures 13.8 and 14.5 kilometers in diameter and its surface has a low albedo of 0.031 and 0.047, respectively, while the Collaborative Asteroid Lightcurve Link assumes a standard albedo for carbonaceous asteroids of 0.057 and calculates a diameter of 14.0 kilometers.

Naming 

This minor planet was named by the discoverer after Aline, Vérionique and Martine (Al-Ve-Ma), his three great-granddaughters, Aline De Middlelaer, and Vérionique and Martine Wark. The official naming citation was published by the Minor Planet Center on 9 September 1995.

References

External links 
 Astrosurf – Laurent Bernasconi
 Asteroid Lightcurve Database (LCDB), query form (info )
 Dictionary of Minor Planet Names, Google books
 Asteroids and comets rotation curves, CdR – Observatoire de Genève, Raoul Behrend
 Discovery Circumstances: Numbered Minor Planets (1)-(5000) – Minor Planet Center
 
 

003567
Discoveries by Eugène Joseph Delporte
Named minor planets
003567
19301115